The Analogs are a Polish street punk band. They originated in Szczecin, and are quite successful on the local and international punk rock scene.

The band is widely regarded for making street punk music popular in Poland. Although they used to claim to be apolitical, The Analogs have always been completely committed to anti-fascism and eventually have started referring to themselves as "100% leftie". They have performed alongside influential ska artist Roy Ellis and recognise the multi-cultural roots of the skinhead subculture.

Band history

The beginnings
In the early 1995, three members of a ska band, Dr. Cycos, came into a rehearsal hall in Szczecin to work on songs to be performed in  traditional punk rock style. These were Marek Adamowicz (guitarist), Ziemowit Pawluk (drummer) and Paweł Czekała (bassist). The band did not have a name at that point.

After melody lines for the first few songs had been prepared the band started to look for a vocalist. The first candidate was Tomasz Iwanow, band members' old friend. However, Iwanow did not work out as a vocalist, because he was a heavy drinker, and he couldn't even memorize the lyrics. In the end Dominik Pyrzyna was chosen as the vocalist for the band.

The first album
As the band had completed its line-up the time came to record the debut album entitled Oi! Młodzież. While recording it (in "Kakadu" studio, Szczecin), the band was simultaneously negotiating with Rock'n'roller productions, especially with its boss - Zdzisław Jodko. Being one of Czekała's longtime friends, Jodko willingly agreed to release the album under Rock'n'roller label. Meanwhile, the band had just been able to give itself a name: The Analogs.

The album was recorded at the same time as an album of Dr. Cycos. On the first day both bands recorded music, and the second day was dedicated to vocals and mixing.

Just after the recording session had ended and the concert of both groups had been played, Czekała's troubles with justice started. In spring 1996 album had finally been released and was able to get a positive response among local alternative music fans. During Czekała's absence bassist position was held by Szymon Gebel and later by Artur Szmit.

Concert with D.O.A. and anti-Analogs independent press releases
Soon after the first album was released the band started playing numerous concerts, the most famous and controversial being a gig played together with a Canadian punk rock band DOA. It took place in Poznań and was mostly remembered for fights that broke out between the band's supporters and the rest of the audience.

From the very beginning of the band's activity, The Analogs stood in strong opposition to anarchist and feminist punks whose ideas were influential on the Polish punk scene of the day. This attitude combined with the DOA concert riots caused many Polish underground media to start an onslaught on the band, mostly counter-productive as calls for boycott significantly contributed to an increase in band's popularity.

On the other hand, the band received considerable support from the Garaż (Polish for garage) magazine.

The beginning of an international career
In 1997 three songs by The Analogs (mistakenly described as Analogics on the cover) appeared on the Oi! it's a world invasion compilation released by Bronco Bullfrog Records and Step-1. In December 2003 The Analogs were invited to play at Punk & Disorderly festival in Germany. They were the only Polish band at that festival. They returned to the same festival the next year as well as in 2006.

Analogs songs appeared on following international compilations:
Oi! It's a world Invasion (Bronco Bullfrog) - 3 songs
Class Pride World Wide 2 (Insurgence Records)
KOB vs. Mad Butcher (KOB/Mad Buther)
Stay Punk! (Havin' a Laugh Records)

Next records
The release of the second album, titled Street Punk Rulez!, was strongly encouraged by Jodko, surprised by the huge success of the debut album. The band was in poor condition, especially because Czekała was still under arrest, whereas Adamowicz began his interest in numerous other music genres. The album was recorded in the same studio as the previous one, with most of the lyrics written by the imprisoned Czekała.

The material was short, the quality bad and many songs were the new versions from the first album. Despite this, the album could certainly be named a success, and some songs reached the level of band's most popular, and are still played live by the band.

It was the first Analogs album released on CD. Just after recording of Street Punk Rulez! was complete, Adamowicz left the band.

In 1999 Czekała recorded some songs in Kakadu Studio. This recording session was resulted as the promo CD attached to "Garaż". This magazine's issue included a band's interview, where new members were introduced. The Analogs played in this set until recordings of the third album, Hlaskover Rock.

Before the album was released, Grzegorz Król had had an alcohol problem, what affected his performances on stage. As the pressure within the band grew he was forced to leave the group. The place of second guitarist was taken by Artur Szmit, who had previously been exchanging Czekała with bass guitar.

Year 2001 began by the concert at the "Punk Great Orchestra of Christmas Charity" in Kraków. At that time the band managed to take Błażej Halski from Vespa band, who exchanged the second guitarist. The Analogs played a set of concerts in Poland and Germany, together with The Prowlers. As both bands' alcohol abusing and their alcoholic parties scared boss of the Mad Buther Records, plans to release The Analogs record in Germany were abandoned.

In fall 2001 a new record Blask Szminki was released. At that time band played their first concert in Prague.

Concerts with the stars
In the beginning of 2002 The Analogs played again at "Punk Great Orchestra of Christmas Charity", together with Anti-Nowhere League, Los Fastidios, Skarface and Oxymoron. After this gig Dariusz Stefański decided to leave the band.

In spring 2002 the band played several concerts in Italy and in summer The Analogs appeared at Antifest in Czech. Jacek Tomczak joined the band as a guitarist.

The same year band supported (together with Bulbulators) The Exploited at the concert in Kraków. Due to high costs of tickets this event had small attendance.

The later records
Another studio session (this time in Elvis Van Tomato, Szczecin) resulted with Trucizna album which was promoted later on a set of gigs with Los Fastidios. As a part of tradition The Analogs included few covers on their record: Cock Sparrer's, The 4-Skins' and The Ramones'.

In 2003 band appeared at Czech Republic's Antifest, being that time the only band from Poland. In that year three members decided to leave the band for different reasons. Ziemowit Pawluk was not able to share his time between The Analogs and his professional career any more, Błażej Halski had to return to his family town, Kielce, and Dariusz Tkaczyk couldn't deal with the absence of the latter. Some crucial changes followed. Paweł Boguszewski took over drummer position and Piotr Półtorak started playing guitar. The most important change was the come back of Dominik Pyrzyna as a vocalist.

In the beginning of 2004, the band released Kroniki Policyjne album which was a long expected one, as it was to be the first album after switching vocalist position back to Dominik.

In October and November 2004 The Analogs played as many concerts as never before and in the beginning of 2005 they took a break, preparing to band's 10th anniversary. The only exception were two trips to Italy.

10 years after...
The 10th anniversary took place at the last weekend of April 2005, and lasted for two days. Many guest stars were invited, including: Schizma, Vespa, AEFDE, Komety, PDS, WSC, Zbeer, Wściekły Pies, Anti Dread and many more.

In summer 2005, the band took part in two large festivals, one in Germany ("Glaubitz") and Czech Republic (Antifest).

On August 22 the premiere of the next record took place, Talent Zero, as a part of celebrating The Analogs anniversary. The album consisted completely of classic punk rock covers with lyrics translated into Polish.

The Analogs today
In the beginning of 2006 "Dmuchacz" left the band, and on his place the band chose Kacper Kosiński. While going on Punk & Disorderly festival Kacper unfortunately did not take his ID, so he had to pass the border on a lent one.

The record Poza Prawem came out in October 2006. The same year band's cover of one of Dezerter's songs was included on Dezerter's tribute album Nie ma zagrożenia - jest Dezerter.
In December 2006 Piotr Półtorak decided to quit the band for "personal and family" reasons. His position was taken over by Miro, guitarist of bands like Anti Dread and Needle & Pins.

Band members

Current members
Paweł "Piguła" Czekała - guitar
Kamil Rosiak - vocals, guitar
Przemysław "Benon" Kaczmarek - bass guitar
Jakub May - drums

Former members

Dominik "Harcerz" Pyrzyna - vocals (1996–1999, 2004–2016)
Marek "Oreł" Adamowicz - guitar (1995–1996)
Artur Szmit - bass guitar (1998–1999), guitar (2000-2001)
Błażej "Komisarz" Halski - guitar (2001–2004)
Ziemowit Pawluk - drummer (1995-2003)

Timeline

Discography
 Oi! Młodzież (Rock'n'roller 1996 / Jimmy Jazz Records 2001)
 Street Punk Rulez! (Rock'n'roller 1997 / Jimmy Jazz Records 2001)
 Hlaskover Rock (Rock'n'roller 1999 / Jimmy Jazz Records 2001)
 Oi! Młodzież/Mechaniczna Pomarańcza (Rock'n'roller 2000 / Jimmy Jazz Records 2001)
 Blask Szminki (Jimmy Jazz Records 2001)
 Trucizna (Jimmy Jazz Records 2003)
 Kroniki Policyjne (Jimmy Jazz Records 2004)
 Talent Zero (Jimmy Jazz Records 2005)
 Poza prawem (Jimmy Jazz Records 2006)
 Najlepsze z najgorszych (Jimmy Jazz Records 2007)
 Miejskie Opowieści (Jimmy Jazz Records 2008)
 Taniec cieni (Jimmy Jazz Records 2010)
 Sos Sos Sos (Street Influence 2011)
 XIII. Ballady czasu upadku - Live in Graffiti (Lou & Rocked Boys 2012)
 Pełnoletnia Oi! Młodzież (Lou & Rocked Boys 2013)
 Na serca mego dnie (Oldschool Records 2013)
 Bezpieczny Port (Lou & Rocked Boys 2014)
 Ostatnia Kołysanka (Oldschool Records 2015)
 30/20 (Lou & Rocked Boys 2017)
 Wilk (Lou & Rocked Boys 2018)
 Projekt Pudło (Oldschool Records 2019)

Notes
After leaving the band, Marek became a drum and bass DJ. The Analogs song called "Marek" is a tribute to him.
He remained in prison for four years.
Released as a vinyl LP in 2005 and 2 years after as a CD + DVD. Compilation of bands all time hits, recorded on a special studio session, prepared for the 10th anniversary.
Iwan died few years later in an accident in London (riding a scooter). Band's song titled Iwan is a tribute to their longtime friend.
First release as a MC, later released as a split with Ramzes & the Hooligans
It is a tradition that The Analogs include foreign punk rock bands covers on their albums. In general those are always translated into Polish. The only exception are "He He He" (Cock Sparrer cover from Oi! Młodzież) and "Rebel Yell" (Billy Idol cover from Street Punk Rulez!)

See also
The Hunkies - hardcore punk project of some of The Analogs members

References

 Analogs history on official website
 Band's official forum
 Jimmy Jazz Records

External links

 Official Website

Polish punk rock groups
Street punk groups
Musical quintets